De minimis is a Latin expression meaning "pertaining to minimal things", normally in the terms de minimis non curat praetor ("The praetor does not concern himself with trifles") or de minimis non curat lex ("The law does not concern itself with trifles"), a legal doctrine by which a court refuses to consider trifling matters.  Queen Christina of Sweden (r. 1633–1654) favoured the similar Latin adage, aquila non capit muscās (the eagle does not catch flies).

The legal history of de minimis dates back to the 15th century.

The general term has come to have a variety of specialised meanings in various contexts as shown below, which indicate that beneath a certain low level a quantity is regarded as trivial, and treated commensurately.

Examples of application of the de minimis rule

Taxation
Under U.S. tax rules, the de minimis rule governs the treatment of small amounts of market discount. Under the rule, if a bond is purchased with a small amount of market discount (an amount less than 0.25% of the face value of a bond times the number of complete years between the bond's acquisition date and its maturity date) the market discount is considered to be zero and the discount on the bond will be considered to be a capital gain upon the bond's disposition or redemption rather than ordinary income. Under Internal Revenue Service guidelines, the de minimis rule can also apply to any benefit, property, or service provided to an employee that has so little value that reporting for it would be unreasonable or administratively impracticable; for example, use of a company photocopier to copy personal documents – see de minimis fringe benefit. Cash is not excludable, regardless of the amount.

Specifically in U.S. State income tax, de minimis refers to the point at which withholdings should be initiated for a nonresident working in a state which taxes personal income. Not all U.S. states levy income taxes, and there's little consistency among nonresident de minimis standards for those that do. Some states base de minimis on the number of days worked (although the definition of what counts as a workday has been controversial), others on the dollars earned or a percentage of total income derived from work in the state, still others using a combination of methods. These inconsistencies have led to repeated attempts to pass the so-called Mobile Workforce State Income Tax Simplification Act without success.

European Union usage
According to European Union regulations, de minimis "state aid" is any amount of aid up to the de minimis ceiling of €200,000 provided from state funds to a business enterprise over a rolling three-year period. For businesses in the land transport sector, the de minimis ceiling is €100,000. If a business receives more than the de minimis ceiling amount of aid, it is subject to a different set of regulations.

Under European Union competition law, some agreements infringing Article 101(1) of the Treaty on the Functioning of the European Union (formerly Article 81(1) of the EC Treaty) are considered to be de minimis and therefore accepted. Horizontal agreement, that is one between competitors, will usually be de minimis where the parties' market share is 10% or less, and a vertical agreement, between undertakings operating at different levels of the market, where it is 15% or less.

Procurement of low value contracts is subject to limited regulation when its value falls below certain low thresholds.

Criminology and crime
In criminology, the de minimis or minimalist approach is an addition to a general harm principle. The general harm principle fails to consider the possibility of other sanctions to prevent harm, and the effectiveness of criminalization as a chosen option. Those other sanctions include civil courts, laws of tort and regulation. Having criminal remedies in place is seen as a "last resort" since such actions often infringe personal liberties – incarceration, for example, prevents the freedom of movement. In this sense, law making that places a greater emphasis on human rights, such as the European Convention on Human Rights, falls into the de minimis category. Most crimes of direct action (murder, rape, assault, for example) are generally not affected by such a stance, but do require greater justification in less clear cases.

The de minimis rule in North American drug law requires a usable quantity of the substance in question before charges can be brought, known as the minority rule.

In Canada, de minimis is often used as a standard of whether a criminal offence is made out at a preliminary stage. For a charge of second degree murder, the test being: "could the jury reasonably conclude that accused actions were a contributing cause, beyond de minimis, of the victim's death."

Risk assessment

In risk assessment, it refers to the highest level of risk that is still too small to be concerned with. Therefore, only risk levels above this de minimis level must be addressed and managed. Some refer to this as a "virtually safe" level.
It has application in the fields of auditing, modeling, and engineering, and may refer to situations of low (negligible) risk. It can be verified in ASA 1.

Copyright 

Courts will occasionally not uphold a claim to copyright on modified public domain material if the changes are deemed to be de minimis. Similarly, courts have dismissed copyright infringement cases on the grounds that the alleged infringer's use of the copyrighted work (such as sampling) was so insignificant as to be de minimis. For example, the NBA 2K video games that included copyrighted tattoos in the recreation of the players' likenesses were found to be in de minimis and not copyright-violating. However, in Bridgeport Music, Inc. v. Dimension Films, such a ruling was overturned on appeal, the US appeals court explicitly declining to recognize a de minimis standard for digital sampling.
"de minimis" was also invoked in the Trevor Newton vs Beastie Boys copyright infringement lawsuit where a 6-second sample of Newton's piece "Choir" was used in "Pass the Mic," Newton lost the case.

In India 

The principle of de minimis non curat lex can be used as defense in India in cases of copyright infringement. The important issue is that whether de minimis principle could be used as separate defence than fair use under section 52 of Indian Copyright Act. In India TV Independent News Service Pvt. Ltd. and Ors. v Yashraj Films Pvt. Ltd., the court discussed the applicability of de mininims principle at length. Before this case the position was not very clear with regard to the applicability. The facts of the case were that five words were copied from a song of five stanzas. After applying the five well-known factors commonly considered by courts in applying de minimis, the court reached the conclusion that the infraction is trivial and attracts the defence of de minimis.

Planning
In environmental planning in New Zealand,  the use of the term 'de minimis' is common in the legal and planning professions. While not defined under the Resource Management Act 1991, it is commonly used in  case law in relation to an assessment of environmental effect, e.g. "the potential adverse effect of one additional road user on the crossing is considered to be de minimis". It is used when an actual or potential effect may exist,  but is so minor it is close to negligible or zero in nature.

Education
In Endrew vs. Douglas County School District, the U.S. Supreme Court unanimously ruled, on March 22, 2017, that the Individuals with Disabilities Education Act (IDEA) requires more than de minimis efforts to provide equivalent educational opportunity to students with disabilities. The decision reversed a previous decision by the U.S. Court of Appeals for the Tenth Circuit.

Logistics
A de minimis threshold is a value set by a country to apply customs duty and tax rates on imported goods. De minimis refers to the minimum value of the goods below which no duties and taxes are being collected by the Customs, and with minimal government review due to low-value items is simply too much hassle to put them through normal customs procedures. The threshold varies from country to country and each threshold is based on local currency. In addition, some countries don’t have a de min­imis rule, so everything gets taxed; oth­er countries don’t have customs duties, so noth­ing gets taxed.

Christian Theology 
The principle of de minimis non curat Lex has been used in defence of the historical reliability of the Gospels. F. W. Upham used the term when speaking of "the [...] minor differences that make up the larger part of the current argument against the Gospels." Simon Greenleaf's, Testimony of the Evangelists is perhaps the most famous application of legal rules to the Christian Gospels.

Miscellaneous examples
Following bus deregulation in Great Britain in 1986, small contracts for supplementary local bus services could be let by local authorities without competitive tendering. The Department for Transport's "Guidance on New De Minimis Rules for Bus Subsidy Contracts" (2005) notes that "The Transport Act 1985 (as amended by the 2000 Transport Act) introduced the provisions which govern the duties of local passenger transport authorities to secure local bus services where these would not otherwise be met. In the majority of cases these services have to be secured through competitive tender. The Service Subsidy Agreements (Tendering) Regulations provided local authorities with the scope to let any individual bus subsidy contract in any one year up to a certain maximum value without the need to competitively tender (the de minimis limits). There was also a maximum value that de minimis contracts could be let with any one operator in any one year."

Under the de minimis provision of the World Trade Organization's Agreement on Agriculture there is no requirement to cap trade-distorting domestic support in any year during which the value of support does not exceed a certain percentage (5–10%) of the national production value per product or of all products taken together if the support is not attributable to any specific product category.

See also 
 List of Latin phrases
 Small claims court
 Sugar bowl (legal maxim)

References

External links
 
 
 

Brocards (law)
Copyright law
Latin legal terminology